Glencoe Regional Health (GRH) is an independent, not-for-profit health system based in Glencoe, Minnesota that was founded in 1941. The main campus includes a primary care clinic, 25-bed critical access hospital, urgent care center and Level III Trauma Center emergency department.

Locations
Glencoe Regional Health operates these facilities:
 Primary-care clinic in Glencoe, Minnesota
 Primary-care clinic in Lester Prairie, Minnesota
 Primary-care clinic in Stewart, Minnesota.
 A 108-bed nursing home, GlenFields Living with Care, on the main campus in Glencoe
 A 40-unit independent senior housing complex, Orchard Estates, on the main campus in Glencoe

References

Hospitals in Minnesota
Hospitals established in 1941
McLeod County, Minnesota
1941 establishments in Minnesota
Health care companies established in 1941